Paul Ionel Botaș (born 10 February 1990) is a Romanian professional footballer who plays as a goalkeeper.

References

External links
 
 

1990 births
Living people
Sportspeople from Brăila
Romanian footballers
Association football goalkeepers
Liga I players
Liga II players
FC Voluntari players
FC Rapid București players
CS Sportul Snagov players
AFC Turris-Oltul Turnu Măgurele players
AFC Dacia Unirea Brăila players
ASC Daco-Getica București players